Falah Waleed (Arabic:فلاح وليد) (born 13 September 1998) is an Emirati footballer who plays as a midfielder for Khor Fakkan on loan from Al Ain.

Career
Falah Waleed played with Al Ain in juniors and participated in the first team. In 2018, he was chosen to participate with the Olympic team to participate in 2020 AFC U-23 Championship. On 27 July 2020, he signed with Khor Fakkan on loan from Al Ain for the season 2020-21.

External links

References

1998 births
Emirati footballers
Olympic footballers of the United Arab Emirates
Living people
Al Ain FC players
Khor Fakkan Sports Club players
UAE Pro League players
Association football midfielders
Place of birth missing (living people)